Hartfield is a village and civil parish in the Wealden district of East Sussex, England. The parish also includes the settlements of  Colemans Hatch, Hammerwood and Holtye, all lying on the northern edge of Ashdown Forest.

Geography
The main village of Hartfield lies seven miles (11.2 km) south-west of Royal Tunbridge Wells where the B2110 road between Groombridge and Forest Row meets the B2026 road between Edenbridge and Maresfield.

Governance
Hartfield Parish Council consists of 13 members. The population of this ward as taken at the 2011 census was 2,639.

The parish settlements

Hartfield is the main village in the parish. The church is dedicated to St Mary the Virgin. There are three public houses: Anchor Inn; Gallipot Inn; and Haywagon Inn. The village street is narrow, precluding much parking although The Anchor and Haywagon Inns have private car parks for patrons only. Note that the Haywagon Inn closed in 2015 following a planning application to convert to housing.

The elder brother of the writer W. Somerset Maugham, Frederic Maugham, 1st Viscount Maugham PC QC, a lawyer and judge who served as Lord Chancellor from March 1938 until September 1939, and his son, the author Robin Maugham, are buried in the churchyard.

Cotchford Farm, Hartfield was the home of A.A. Milne (1882–1956), author of the Winnie the Pooh books, from where many of his books are set; later it was owned by Brian Jones, guitarist and founder of The Rolling Stones who was discovered dead in the pool in 1969. There is a shop in the village dedicated to all things connected with the Winnie the Pooh stories.

Henry VIII was believed to have used Bolebroke Castle, located a short distance from the village, where he hunted wild boar and deer at the nearby Ashdown Forest. He also was believed to have courted Anne Boleyn from this castle.

Hartfield had a railway station on the Three Bridges to Tunbridge Wells Central Line until it was closed in 1967. Most of the former trackbed is now part of the Forest Way, forms part of National Cycle Route 21, and is much used by walkers and cyclists. The station building itself is now used as a pre-school. There is a bus service that connects the village with Crawley, East Grinstead and Tunbridge Wells.

There are a number of businesses in the village.

Colemans Hatch
The hamlet of Colemans Hatch lies to the south-west of Hartfield. It is a scattered settlement around a series of road junctions. The church here is dedicated to the Holy Trinity and is part of the joint benefice with St Mary's Hartfield. The Hatch Inn is located here. 

The imposing South Hartfield House has some interesting connections. During the 19th century, one of the Wedgwood sisters is thought to have lived at the house and Charles Darwin, who was closely related to the family, both by blood and by marriage, was a frequent visitor. The house was later rented by Fruity Metcalfe, an Indian army officer and a close friend and equerry of Edward VIII. Following the Abdication, the Duke and Duchess of Windsor are understood to have stayed there after the war. Another illustrious resident was General Sir Reginald Hildyard, who died there in 1965, aged 88.

Hammerwood

The name Hammerwood comes from the Wealden iron industry and relates to the numerous hammer-ponds found in the area.  Streams in the locality can still run red with the colour of iron in the water. A hammer-pond is a water reservoir created specifically for providing power to water-powered hammers, forges or blast furnaces. There were many Medway watermills in the area.

The church was completed in 1880 funded by local landowner Oswald Augustus Smith and built to a design of E.P. Loftus Brock. Smith also funded the rebuilding of St Peter's Church in Holtye within the same parish. The church can be found on the main road. Inside the church is a pipe organ built by T.C. Lewis of Brixton in 1884.

There is a Scout campsite at Hammerwood owned and operated by the Lewisham North District Scouts.

Hammerwood Park
Hammerwood Park is a country house south of the village: it is a Grade I listed building. Built in 1792, it was the first work of the architect Benjamin Latrobe, who was also responsible for the United States Capitol in Washington, D.C. It was one of the first houses in England built in the Greek Revival style. 

It was purchased by the rock band Led Zeppelin in 1973, but not properly maintained by them. Left almost derelict, it was then bought in 1982 and restoration began: that restoration was award-winning and received a lot of television coverage. The house is often used for filming, and is open to the public in the summer: concerts are often held there.

Holtye
Holtye is immediately north-east of Hammerwood. Here the public house, The White Horse Inn, closed in 2014; the church is dedicated to St Peter, although the church is now redundant.

Marsh Green
Marsh Green is a group of buildings near Colemans Hatch. The region has been mentioned in census records since 1841. Marsh Green is close to the Poohsticks Bridge, and visitors missing the turning can find themselves there.

Newbridge
A small settlement most notable for the remains of the earliest blast furnace in England. Founded in about 1496, the furnace was last referred to in 1603. It was probably constructed on the site of an earlier bloomery. Also in the hamlet is an 18th century corn mill and mill house, both are Grade II listed.

Landmarks
Ashdown Forest falls partly within the parish. This Site of Special Scientific Interest is a large area of common ground comprising area of semi-natural woodland, heath and bog.

Demography
In the 2001 census return, there were 2,105 people in the parish. Age breakdown is approximately as follows: 0–15:  28%; 16–59: 49%; 60+ : 23%. There were 1,640 registered voters in 1998.  The average values of houses in 2001 for Hartfield parish for all property types was £286,736.

References

External links

 
Villages in East Sussex
Civil parishes in East Sussex
Wealden District
Ashdown Forest